Salvador Medina Cárcamo (born January 27, 1988, in Distrito Federal) is a former Mexican professional football defender who last played for Ballenas Galeana Morelos in the Liga de Ascenso. He made only one appearance for Pumas first team before joining Jaguares in 2009.

References

External links
 

1988 births
Living people
Mexican footballers
Association football defenders
Club Universidad Nacional footballers
Ballenas Galeana Morelos footballers
Liga MX players
Ascenso MX players
Liga Premier de México players
Footballers from Mexico City